Gilles Archambault (March 9, 1934 – October 25, 2009) was a professional Canadian football player who played for the Calgary Stampeders and Ottawa Rough Riders. He played junior football previously in Ottawa and in Verdun, Quebec.

References

1934 births
2009 deaths
People from Montérégie
Players of Canadian football from Quebec
Canadian football tackles
Ottawa Gee-Gees football players
Calgary Stampeders players
Ottawa Rough Riders players
French Quebecers